Señorita República Dominicana 1972 was held on March 1, 1972. There were 28 candidates who competed for the national crown. The winner represented the Dominican Republic at the Miss Universe 1972 . The Virreina al Miss Mundo will enter Miss World 1972. Only the 27 province, 1 municipality entered. On the top 10 they showed their evening gown and answered questions so they could go to the top 5. In the top 5 they would answer more questions.

Results

Señorita República Dominicana 1972 : Ivonne Lucia Butler de los Montellanos (Barahona)
Virreina al Miss Mundo : Teresa Evangelina Medrano Espaillat (Puerto Plata)
1st Runner Up : Sandra Pineda (Santiago)
2nd Runner Up : Lucia Castro (Duarte)
3rd Runner Up : Eva Toledo (Santo Domingo de Guzmán)

Top 10

Lisbeth Ynoa (Salcedo)
Gina Rioz (Santiago Rodríguez)
Etna Sainz (Azua)
Laila González (San Pedro)
Eva Marte (Samaná)

Special awards
 Miss Rostro Bello – Amparo Lucres (La Romana)
 Miss Photogenic (voted by press reporters) - Diana Suarez  (Séibo)
 Miss Congeniality (voted by Miss Dominican Republic Universe contestants) - Ana Batista (San Juan de la Maguana)
 Best Provincial Costume - Lila Ocoa (San Cristóbal)

Delegates

 Azua - Etna María Sainz Costa
 Baoruco - María Valentina Burlington Abreu
 Barahona - Ivonne Lucia Butler de los Montellanos
 Dajabón - María Antonieta de la Cruz Tias
 Distrito Nacional - Estefania Digna de Ferrer Zamor
 Duarte - Lucia Reyna Castro Martínez
 Espaillat - Adriana Martha Windsrow Milos
 Independencia - Miledys Katalina Alvarado Coñado
 La Altagracia - Germanialedys Ana Ferreira Oviedo
 La Estrelleta - Katia Mary Trujillo Meran
 La Romana - Amparo Zamina Lucres Luna
 La Vega - Amelia Victoria Rodríguez Vargas
 María Trinidad Sánchez - María Eugenia Cadus Tarragona
 Monte Cristi - María Caridad Ramírez Sánchez
 Pedernales - Ana Iris Duarte Valle
 Peravia - Martha Agnes Farfán Juanes
 Puerto Plata - Teresa Evangelina Medrano Espaillat
Salcedo - Lisbeth Tatia Ynoa Ureña
 Samaná - Eva María Marte Rosario
 Sánchez Ramírez - Helga Karina Muñoz Sosa
 San Cristóbal -   Lila Iliana Ocoa Soriano
 San Juan de la Maguana - Ana Eugenia Batista Roth
 San Pedro - Ana Laila González Roman
 Santiago - Sandra Magdalena Pineda de los Duartes
 Santiago Rodríguez - Mary Gina Rioz Espinoza
 Séibo - Diana Mary Suarez Suarez
 Santo Domingo de Guzmán - Eva Arelis Toledo Arevalos
 Valverde - Isabel Magdalena Monroig Ramos

Miss Dominican Republic
1972 beauty pageants
1972 in the Dominican Republic